This was a new event in 2012.

Nina Bratchikova and Oksana Kalashnikova won the title, defeating Julia Glushko and Noppawan Lertcheewakarn 6–0, 4–6, [10–8] in the final.

Seeds

Draw

Draw
{{16TeamBracket-Compact-Tennis3
| RD1=First round
| RD2=Quarterfinals
| RD3=Semifinals
| RD4=Final

| RD1-seed01=1
| RD1-team01= E Birnerová A Klepač
| RD1-score01-1=3
| RD1-score01-2=6
| RD1-score01-3=[10]
| RD1-seed02= 
| RD1-team02= C-w Chan C Liu
| RD1-score02-1=6
| RD1-score02-2=4
| RD1-score02-3=[3]

| RD1-seed03= 
| RD1-team03= K Date-Krumm K Nara
| RD1-score03-1=6
| RD1-score03-2=6
| RD1-score03-3=
| RD1-seed04=WC
| RD1-team04= A Bhargava S Shapatava
| RD1-score04-1=2
| RD1-score04-2=1
| RD1-score04-3=

| RD1-seed05=4
| RD1-team05=
| RD1-score05-1=6
| RD1-score05-2=6
| RD1-score05-3=
| RD1-seed06= 
| RD1-team06= W-y Chan N Chilumula
| RD1-score06-1=2
| RD1-score06-2=2
| RD1-score06-3=

| RD1-seed07= 
| RD1-team07= P Bhambri R Sunkara
| RD1-score07-1=6
| RD1-score07-2=6
| RD1-score07-3=
| RD1-seed08=WC
| RD1-team08= A Andrady S Burman
| RD1-score08-1=4
| RD1-score08-2=0
| RD1-score08-3=

| RD1-seed09= 
| RD1-team09= S-j Jang S-r Lee
| RD1-score09-1=2
| RD1-score09-2=3
| RD1-score09-3=
| RD1-seed10= 
| RD1-team10= Y Xu Y Zhou
| RD1-score10-1=6
| RD1-score10-2=6
| RD1-score10-3=

| RD1-seed11= 
| RD1-team11= R Chakravarthi A Raina
| RD1-score11-1=64
| RD1-score11-2=4
| RD1-score11-3=
| RD1-seed12=3
| RD1-team12= M Adamczak S Bengson
| RD1-score12-1=77
| RD1-score12-2=6
| RD1-score12-3=

| RD1-seed13= 
| RD1-team13= O Savchuk E Svitolina
| RD1-score13-1=6
| RD1-score13-2=6
| RD1-score13-3=
| RD1-seed14= 
| RD1-team14= L Kumkhum Vara Wongteanchai
| RD1-score14-1=3
| RD1-score14-2=3
| RD1-score14-3=

| RD1-seed15= 
| RD1-team15= R Bhosale P Thombare
| RD1-score15-1=3
| RD1-score15-2=3
| RD1-score15-3=
| RD1-seed16=2
| RD1-team16= N Bratchikova O Kalashnikova
| RD1-score16-1=6
| RD1-score16-2=6
| RD1-score16-3=

| RD2-seed01=1
| RD2-team01= E Birnerová A Klepač
| RD2-score01-1=77
| RD2-score01-2=6
| RD2-score01-3=
| RD2-seed02=
| RD2-team02= K Date-Krumm K Nara
| RD2-score02-1=64
| RD2-score02-2=4
| RD2-score02-3=

| RD2-seed03=4
| RD2-team03=

References
 Main Draw

Royal Indian Open - Doubles
2012 in Indian tennis
Royal Indian Open